A speeder (also known as a section car, railway motor car, putt-putt, track-maintenance car, crew car, jigger, trike, quad, trolley, inspection car, or a draisine) is a small railcar formerly used around the world by track inspectors and work crews to move quickly to and from work sites. Although slow compared to a train or car, it is called speeder because it is faster than a human-powered vehicle such as a handcar. Motorised inspection cars date back to at least 1896, when it was reported that the U.S. Daimler Motor Company created a gasoline-powered rail inspection car capable of 15 mph (24 km/h).

In the 1990s, many speeders were replaced by pickup trucks or sport utility vehicles with additional flanged wheels that could be lowered for travelling on rails, called "road–rail vehicles" or hi-rails for "highway-railroad". Speeders are collected by hobbyists, who refurbish them for excursions organized by the North American Railcar Operators Association in the U.S. and Canada and the Australian Society of Section Car Operators, Inc. in Australia.

Motorcar manufacturers and models 

Various railways and their workshops also manufactured speeders. Often these were a copy of commercially available cars, such as Wickham and Fairmont.

Dimensions 
Approximate dimensions of a common speeder car are given below. Due to the variety of base models and customization these are not fixed numbers. These values are from a Fairmont A4-D.
Rail gauge:  (56.5 inches)
Weight: 
Width:  
Height:   
Length:  (~110 inches)
Wheel diameter: 
Floor height: 80–120% of the wheel diameter; -

Gallery

See also 

 Cater MetroTrolley
 Draisine
 Handcar
 North American Railcar Operators Association
 Railbus
 Railcar
 Road-rail vehicle
 The Railrodder

Notes

References

External links 

 Motorcars, Speeders & Handcars
 NARCOA
 CVRTC - New England Speeder Group
 Wickham of Ware Discussion Group

Maintenance of way equipment